Crassispira elatior is a species of sea snail, a marine gastropod mollusk in the family Pseudomelatomidae.

Description
The length of the shell attains 5 mm, its diameter 2 mm.

The small, subconical shell contains 6 whorls. It has a whitish color with orange brown brands interrupted by the ribs. The whorls are convex and show 12 not very robust ribs and rather shallow decurrent spirals (on the penultimate whorl 19 ribs and 3 to 4 spirals). The sinus is deep. The outer lip shows a slight varix. The siphonal canal is very short.

Distribution
This marine species occurs in the Caribbean Sea off Jamaica, Guadeloupe and Saint Martin

References

 Fallon P.J. (2011) Descriptions and illustrations of some new and poorly known turrids (Turridae) of the tropical northwestern Atlantic. Part 2. Genus Crassispira Swainson, 1840, subgenera Monilispira Bartsch & Rehder, 1939 and Dallspira Bartsch, 1950. The Nautilus 125(1): 15–28.

External links
 MNHN: specimen
 
 De Jong K.M. & Coomans H.E. (1988) Marine gastropods from Curaçao, Aruba and Bonaire. Leiden: E.J. Brill. 261 pp. 

elatior
Gastropods described in 1845